Leslie "Les" Massie (20 July 1935 – 11 November 2020) was a Scottish footballer, who played most of his games during the 1950s and 1960s for Huddersfield Town.

Biography
Massie and ex-Huddersfield player John Coddington signed for Drogheda United in January 1973. He made his League of Ireland debut on 4 February 1973 at Lourdes Stadium.

In 2006, he was named on Huddersfield's 100 fans' favourites of all time.

Massie died on 11 November 2020.

References

External links
 

Scottish footballers
Association football inside forwards
English Football League players
Huddersfield Town A.F.C. players
Darlington F.C. players
Halifax Town A.F.C. players
Bradford (Park Avenue) A.F.C. players
Workington A.F.C. players
Banks O' Dee F.C. players
Drogheda United F.C. players
League of Ireland players
Footballers from Aberdeen
1935 births
2020 deaths